Voe Minas Gerais was a program and informal name of a domestic airline based in Belo Horizonte/Pampulha – Carlos Drummond de Andrade Airport, Brazil, established in 2016 by the Government of the State of Minas Gerais via its Minas Gerais Development Company CODEMGE.

Flights were operated by the contractor company TwoFlex on behalf of Voe Minas Gerais. According to the National Civil Aviation Agency of Brazil (ANAC), between January and December 2018, Voe Minas Gerais operated by Two Flex had 0% of the domestic market share in terms of passengers per kilometre flown.

The program was discontinued on June 30, 2019.

History
Officially known as Projeto de Integração Regional de Minas Gerais-Modal Aéreo PIRMA and informally known as Voe Minas Gerais, the project was established in August 2016 by the Government of the State of Minas Gerais under the responsibility of the Secretariat of Economic Development of Minas Gerais, as a project of State integration using aircraft. The first flight took off on August 17, 2016.

Since its conception, the project was divided into phases, with destinations and schedules being constantly evaluated, with destinations added, maintained or terminated according to demand. In April 2019, the program implemented its 11th and last phase.

Flights were operated by the contract company TwoFlex using its Cessna 208 Caravan aircraft. Schedule flights, sold using Voe Minas Gerais commercial platform, were operated Monday to Friday using Belo Horizonte/Pampulha – Carlos Drummond de Andrade Airport as hub.

The program was discontinued on June 30, 2019. The State Government has plans to support the busiest routes via private operators.

Destinations
In its eleven phases (the last one was implemented in April 2019), the program operated scheduled services to the following destinations:

Fleet
Flights were operated by the Contract Company TwoFlex using Cessna 208 Caravan aircraft.

Airline affinity program
Voe Minas Gerais had no Frequent Flyer Program but offered discounts on bulk and advanced purchase tickets.

See also
List of defunct airlines of Brazil

References

External links
 Facebook page

Defunct airlines of Brazil
Airlines established in 2016
Airlines disestablished in 2019
2016 establishments in Brazil
2019 disestablishments in Brazil